University Prep Schools (U Prep Schools) is a K-12 charter school system headquartered in the New Center area of Detroit. It has two districts within its system: University Preparatory Academy (UPA) and University Prep Science & Math (UPSM).

History
The first University Preparatory Academy middle school opened its doors in Detroit in the fall of 2000 with 112 6th graders.  Founded by former U.S Assistant Secretary of Labor and Michigan State Senator Doug Ross, the school was established as a public charter school with a mission of graduating its open admission Detroit children from high school and enrolling them in college at comparable rates to affluent suburban schools.  The school modeled itself after the Big Picture schools in Rhode Island that developed a program of individualized learning that was producing impressive results with urban children.  

In the spring of 2002, the University Prep middle school was visited by the philanthropists  Robert "Bob" Thompson, a philanthropist who is from Hillsdale County, Michigan and Ellen Thompson at the suggestion of then Michigan Governor John Engler.  Bob Thompson had previously offered a $200 million donation to the Detroit public schools if the district agreed to create 15 new public schools, but the district rejected the offer.  The Thompsons indicated a desire to help, and Ross stated that his current 7th graders would need a high school in the fall of 2003 which he had not yet figured out how to provide.  The Thompsons generously offered to build a new high school for University Prep, but asked that a performance agreement be included.  Ross and the Thompsons agreed that the goal would be to graduate at least 90% of the first senior class in 2007 and each class thereafter and to enroll at least 90% of those graduates in post-secondary studies.  90-90, which was exceeded in 2007 and in succeeding classes, became the U Prep system’s brand.  Charlene Johnson, the Board Chair at the time stated that “achieving this outcome that most folks thought was impossible sets a new standard for the city that eliminates excuses for not giving Detroit children of color education opportunities afforded more affluent children."

As a result of Ross’s leadership and the Thompson Foundation’s extraordinary generosity, which allowed the system to take its innovative model to scale and educate thousands of Detroit children, University Prep grew to two systems—University Preparatory Academy and University Prep Science and Math—with two high schools, two middle schools, and three elementary schools by 2012 when Ross left to become the Chief Innovation Officer at the Detroit Public Schools.  The system’s board, Detroit 90-90, brought in Mark Ornstein as the new CEO who was replaced in 2020 by Danielle Jackson, a long-time University Prep leader and former high school principal. A third charter district, the School for Creative Studies, was subsequently added to the University Prep family.  Bob and Ellen Thompson through their foundation have continued their dedicated support of the schools.

Academic performance
As part of the establishment of U Prep, the Thompsons asked the school to retain 90% of its high school students and to have 90% of them attend universities and other post-secondary education. In 2010 the graduation rate was 95% with almost all of the students moving on to tertiary education. 57% of the students in the class of 2007 enrolled in two-year schools as sophomores had attended the same ones as freshmen, while 83% enrolled in four year universities attended the same ones as sophomores that they did as freshmen.

Dan Rather stated in the 2011 program  "A National Disgrace" that the test scores in the U Prep school system "are much closer to the Michigan state average" and "many points higher" compared to test scores from Detroit Public Schools (DPS) campuses.

University Preparatory Academy
Mitch Albom, a columnist of the Detroit Free Press, described the school as "one of the top charter schools in Detroit." African-Americans make up the majority of the school system's students.

Schools within UPA include:
 Ellen Thompson Elementary School (New Center)
 Mark Murray Elementary School (New Center)
 University Prep Academy Middle School (Midtown)
 University Prep Academy High School (New Center)

The high school, which Albom describes as appearing similar to the campus of a university, has small classrooms. Albom stated that it has "first-rate" teachers.

University Prep Science & Math
Schools within UPSM include:
 University Prep Science & Math Elementary School
 University Prep Science & Math Middle School (Midtown)
 University Prep Science & Math High School

The high school, which opened in the fall of 2010 with 125 students in the 9th grade, opened in a former warehouse. The former warehouse, bought and renovated jointly by the Community Foundation for Southeast Michigan and the Thompson Education Foundation, is in proximity to Chene Park. The Thompson Foundation paid $14.5 million while the Community Foundation of Southeast Michigan paid $1.5 million.

See also
List of public school academy districts in Michigan

References

Further reading
Finley, Nolan. "What Newark got, Detroit turned down" (Archive) (Opinions and Editorial). The Detroit News. September 30, 2010.

External links
 University Prep Schools

High schools in Detroit
Schools in Detroit
Public high schools in Michigan
Public middle schools in Michigan
Public elementary schools in Michigan